John Gorham may refer to:

 John Gorham (graphic designer), British graphic designer
 John Gorham (military officer), New England Ranger
 John Gorham (physician), American physician and educator
 John Marshall Gorham, British motorboat racer